Mammillaria backebergiana is a species of cactus in the subfamily Cactoideae. It is native to Mexico and can be found on cliffs at elevations of around 1,900 m.

References

Plants described in 1966
backebergiana